The Knockmealdown Mountains are a mountain range located on the border of counties Tipperary and Waterford in Ireland, running east and west between the two counties. The highest peak of the range is Knockmealdown, in County Waterford. On the western side of the summit, the range is crossed by a high pass called ‘The Vee’ through which runs the old mail coach road from Lismore to Clogheen.

The mountains were formerly known as Sliabh gCua, sometimes anglicized 'Slieve Gua' or 'Slieve Goe'.

Mountain peaks
List of peaks in the Knockmealdown Mountains ordered by height:
Knockmealdown, Cnoc Mhaoldomhnaigh (794 m)
Knockmoylan, Cnoc Maoláin (768 m)
Knocknafallia, Cnoc na Faille (668 m)
Sugarloaf Hill, Cnoc na gCloch (663 m)
Knocknagnauv, Cnoc na gCnámh (655 m)
Knockshanahullion, Cnoc Seanchuillinn (652 m)
Knocknalougha, Cnoc na Loiche (630 m)
Knockmeal, An Cnoc Maol (560 m)
Crohan West, An Cruachán (521 m)
Farbreaga, An Fear Bréige (518 m)

Wildlife
This mountain range is an important  breeding ground for two endangered species, the red grouse and the hen harrier; cuckoo, nightjar, crossbill, buzzard and grasshopper warbler can also be seen.

References

Mountains and hills of County Waterford
Marilyns of Ireland
Hewitts of Ireland
Mountains and hills of County Tipperary